Trunk Muzik is a mixtape by southern rapper Yelawolf, released on January 1, 2010. It features ten all new songs and two remixes. It is hosted by DJ Burn One and contains production from WLPWR, Malay & KP and Kane Beatz and features guest appearances from Bun B, Rittz, Diamond, Raekwon and Juelz Santana.

Track listing

Trunk Muzik 0-60

Trunk Muzik 0-60 is the second extended play by American rapper Yelawolf. It was released on November 22, 2010, by Interscope Records. The EP features guest appearances by Gucci Mane, Rock City, Rittz, Bun B and Raekwon; and features six tracks taken from his last mixtape titled Trunk Muzik. Production was handled by WLPWR, Jim Jonsin and Drama Beats, among others.

Composition and music structure
The accompanying music video for the song "Daddy's Lambo" was released. The album's third track "That's What We on Now", has instrumentation that includes "Klaxon synthesizers and a swift, ticking beat". The mixtape's second single, "I Just Wanna Party" featuring Gucci Mane. "Billy Crystal" is a song featuring music duo Rock City. "Pop the Trunk" was chosen as the album's lead single. This track features instrumentation that includes piano and saxophone. Lyrically, "Pop the Trunk" describes an "account of street justice" and "meth dealers in Appalachia". "Box Chevy" featuring Rittz. "Good to Go" featuring Bun B; an accompanying music video was released. "Marijuana" is the most prominent representation of rock music on Trunk Muzik 0-60. The album's tenth track "Love Is Not Enough", has been described as an "aching ballad". "I Wish" is a song featuring Raekwon. "Get the Fuck Up!" is used as one of the tracks on a video game Madden NFL '12 and at the beginning of the 9th episode of 2 season of Power.

Release and reception
Trunk Muzik 0-60 was released in the United States on November 22, 2010 by Interscope Records. On the week ending of November 28, 2010, Trunk Muzik 0-60 selling 5,000 copies in its first week. The EP peaked at number one on the Top Heatseekers Albums Chart, at number 16 on the Top Rap Albums Chart, and at number 26 on the Top R&B Albums Chart. As of March 2012, the EP has sold 108,000 copies in the United States. "Pop the Trunk" and "I Just Wanna Party" were released as singles; the former failed to rank on national chart, while the latter charted on the Bubbling Under Hot 100 Singles at number 9. As of October 2012, the album has sold 171,204 copies. As of August 2013, the album has sold 210,000 copies in the United States.

Trunk Muzik 0-60 received generally positive reviews.

0-60 Track listing

Sample credits
"Love Is Not Enough" contains a sample of "Hollywood" by Rick James, and an interpolation of "Anythang" by Devin The Dude
"Marijuana" features a sample of "Moist Vagina" by Nirvana

Personnel

 Yelawolf – vocals, composer
 Ray Alba – publicity
 Marcus Beatty – engineer
 Shannon jennings - engineer - [audio mixing] - [audio mastering]
 Ian Blanton – engineer
 Janine Booth – vocals
 Leslie Brathwaite - mixing
 Nikkiya Brooks – vocals
 Bun B - vocals
 Laura Carter - marketing coordination
 Regina Davenport - A&R
 Archie Davis - marketing coordination
 Radric Davis - composer
 Dennis Dennehy - publicity
 Seneca Doss - marketing coordination
 Andrew Flad - marketing
 Bernard Freeman - composer
 Gucci Mane - vocals
 James Ho - composer
 Matt Huber - assistant
 Rick James - composer
 Irvin Johnson - engineer
 Jeremy Jones - management
 Jim Jonsin - instrumentation, producer, programming
 Dave Kutch - mastering
 Amanda Lunt - A&R
 Robert Marks - engineer, mixing
 Hannibal Matthews - photography

 Tristan McClain - engineer
 Sean Mccoy - assistant
 Jonny McCullom - composer
 Todd Parker - A&R
 Chris Pfaff - composer, instrumentation, producer, programming
 Bradley Post - engineer
 Kawan Prather - composer, A&R, executive producer
 Raekwon - vocals
 Christopher Richardson - engineer
 Rock City - vocals
 James Schafer - Composer
 Shawty Fatt - vocals
 Courtney Sills - management
 Muzzy Solis - assistant
 Theron Thomas - composer
 Timothy Thomas - composer
 Tamara Tickaradze - vocals
 Andrew Van Meter - production coordination
 Cameron Wallace - composer, instrumentation, producer, programming
 William Washington - composer
 Jason Wilkie - assistant
 Willpower - instrumentation, producer, programming
 Jason Wilson - assistant
 Luke Wood - A&R
 Corey Woods - composer
 Ian the Zevos - creation

References

2010 mixtape albums
Interscope Records EPs
Albums produced by Drumma Boy
Albums produced by Jim Jonsin
Albums produced by WLPWR
Yelawolf EPs
DGC Records EPs